Harbourside Park in Poole, England has two components:

 Baiter Park
 Whitecliff Park

References

See also 

 Harborside (disambiguation)

Parks and open spaces in Dorset